Anna Maria Bernadette "Det" de Beus (18 February 1958 – 21 July 2013) in the Netherlands. Born in Utrecht, she was the first goalkeeper in women's field hockey to wear a mask.

A player from Eindhovense Mixed Hockey Club in Eindhoven, De Beus played in goal for the Netherlands between 1978 and 1988. She played 105 caps for her country and was part of the gold medal winning Olympic team in the 1984 Summer Olympics in Los Angeles. She retired from the sport at the end of Olympic Games in Seoul in September 1988 after winning the bronze medal by beating Great Britain 3–1.

She died of cancer in Rijswijk in July 2013.

References

External links
 
 Dutch Hockey Federation

1958 births
2013 deaths
Dutch female field hockey players
Female field hockey goalkeepers
Field hockey players at the 1984 Summer Olympics
Field hockey players at the 1988 Summer Olympics
Olympic gold medalists for the Netherlands
Olympic bronze medalists for the Netherlands
Olympic field hockey players of the Netherlands
Olympic medalists in field hockey
Sportspeople from Utrecht (city)
Deaths from cancer in the Netherlands
Medalists at the 1988 Summer Olympics
Medalists at the 1984 Summer Olympics
20th-century Dutch women
20th-century Dutch people